The battle for the world's premier 1-on-1 B-Boy World Championship comes to India for the first time ever in 2015, with the Red Bull BC One India Cypher. Held in over 90 locations around the world, Red Bull BC One Cyphers are conducted to determine one winner from each participating country, who then battle it out at six regional Finals and then finally, one World Final, to determine the foremost B-Boy in the world. Winner of Red Bull BC One India Cypher represents India in Red Bull BC One Asia Pacific Finals. B-Boy Flying Machine won the inaugural edition of the Red Bull BC One India Cypher and represented India in Red Bull BC One Asia Pacific Finals.
Event Sponsor:  Red Bull

Winners

2015

RBBC1 India Cypher 2015 Results 
Following an intensive round of qualifiers, 16 of the country's best B-Boys battled it out at the Red Bull BC One India Cypher for the chance to represent India at the Red Bull BC One Asia Pacific Finals in Seoul, South Korea on 17 October. The Red Bull BC One World Final held in Rome, Italy on 14 November 2015.
Date: June 13, 2015
Location: Mumbai, India

DJ: DJ Light 
Judges: Hong 10, Taisuke, RoxRite

Red Bull BC One